Merchants Millpond State Park is a North Carolina state park in Gates County, North Carolina, in the United States. Located near Gatesville, in North Carolina's coastal plain, it covers  around a 200-year-old,  millpond and Lassiter Swamp. Canoeing is one of the park's major attractions.  Alligators live in its large cypress swamps.

History
Settlement in the Gates County area began in 1660. Residents of early rural communities made a living by farming and lumbering. In the early 18th century, Hunters Millpond was built at the head of Bennetts Creek to provide a means of processing and marketing regional produce. Highway construction destroyed this millpond in 1922. But further downstream, Norfleets Millpond, which was built in 1811, thrived. Gristmills, a sawmill, a farm supply store and other enterprises made the area the center of trade in Gates County. Thus, the pond became known as Merchants Millpond.

Shortly before World War II operations around the millpond came to a halt and millers sold the land to developers. In the 1960s, A.B. Coleman of Moyock purchased the property and later donated , including the millpond, to the state. His generous donation led to the establishment of Merchants Millpond State Park in 1973.

References

External links
 
 Video: Canoeing Merchants Millpond State Park

State parks of North Carolina
Protected areas of Gates County, North Carolina
Protected areas established in 1973
Water trails
1973 establishments in North Carolina